Vulnerabilia is the debut EP by American singer Chaz Cardigan. It was released on February 13, 2020 through Capitol Records and Loud Robot (a subsidiary of J. J. Abrams's Bad Robot production company).

Background 
Cardigan self-released a series of singles throughout 2018 that continually were placed on Spotify's New Music Friday editorial playlist. Within an 8-month span these songs accumulated 1 million streams. A quick rise in streaming numbers and a series of sold-out hometown shows attracted the attention of several record labels.  On the writing of Vulnerabilia, he's said:"It’s wild, actually: as a Pop music scene started forming in Nashville, every writer in town that didn’t work on country music sort of got thrown under that umbrella.  My background is more rock and indie stuff, and I was suddenly working in rooms with electronic producers, which was a really cool creative period — I got some really cool songs from that year and I was just excited to put them out even if they were a little more electronic-sounding than I was really focusing on.  So everything that felt a little more immediate I put out as a single, and everything that felt more like a body of work I kept and worked on together.  Through ’18 I would test songs out by slipping them in and out of set lists at my shows, and the EP became whatever resonated the most on stage."He's commented that the title was imagined after a silent retreat at a monastery, and that it means "a collection of personal moments".

Like his previous work, Cardigan self-produced and played every instrument on the EP.  It was completed before Cardigan was signed to Capitol Records, and at one point was planned as an independent release. The EP was preceded by the lead single "Not OK!", Cardigan's first song to receive radio play.

Prior to the COVID-19 pandemic, the EP was announced alongside tour dates with Cardigan's label mate Barns Courtney.

Track listing

Personnel 

 Chaz Cardigan - production, all instruments
 Jamie Lidell - additional production, engineering
 Jon Kaplan - mixing

References 

Capitol Records EPs
EPs by American artists
Indie rock EPs
2020 debut EPs